Carlos Padial García (born 27 August 1977), known professionally as Carlo Padial, is a comics artist, writer, screenwriter and film director.

In 2011 he wrote Dinero gratis, and Erasmus, Orgasmus y otros problemas. In 2017 he directed the comedy film Algo muy gordo, starring Berto Romero. It was analyzed as the end of the comedy. In 2018 he shot the documentary film Bocadillo, starring Wismichu. He directed Vosotros sois mi película, which was released on Flooxer.

Filmography

Films
 Vosotros sois mi película (2019)
 Something Huge (2017)
 Taller Capuchoc (2014)
 Mi loco Erasmus (2012)

TV series
 Més dinamita (2010)

References

External links
 
 

1977 births
Spanish comics artists
Writers from Barcelona
Spanish comics writers
Spanish male writers
20th-century Spanish writers
21st-century Spanish writers
Spanish screenwriters
Male screenwriters
Film directors from Catalonia
Living people